Rebecca Grant may refer to:

 Rebecca Grant (British actress) (born 1982), British actress, singer and dancer